Dan Villa is a Democratic Party member of the Montana House of Representatives, representing District 86 since 2004. He currently serves as Chairman of the Sub-committee on Education. He served as Minority Caucus Leader in 2006.

External links
Montana House of Representatives - Dan Villa official MT State Legislature website
Project Vote Smart - Representative Dan Villa (MT) profile
Follow the Money - Dan Villa
2008 2006 2004 campaign contributions

Members of the Montana House of Representatives
1983 births
Living people
People from Anaconda, Montana